The COEX Aquarium in Gangnam district, Seoul, is one of South Korea's Public Aquariums.
The aquarium is housed within the COEX mall, which is, itself, part of the larger COEX Convention & Exhibition Center.  The aquarium opened in 2000.

Exhibits

The COEX Aquarium features 90 exhibition tanks grouped in fourteen "discovery zones", including six themed areas.
The COEX Aquarium is arranged such that visitors follow a preset path through the aquarium, experiencing each of the themed areas in turn.  Each exhibit features a dedicated aquarium tank where visitors can view species of fish indigenous to the theme location.  In addition to fish, other local animals are included in the exhibit such as birds, otters, and appropriate vegetation is also included in each exhibit.

In the undersea tunnel exhibit, visitors walk in an acrylic tunnel through a tank containing 2000 tons of water.  The tank includes sharks and sea turtles which swim around visitors in all directions.

In an introductory first gallery, six tanks are filled with fish which are changed each season.  The aquarium also features exhibits detailing the local Korean river ecosystems. The COEX Aquarium also features several smaller exhibits, many with a focus on entertaining children. One such exhibit, titled "Wonderland", contains a collection of "eccentric fish tanks" including a shower cubicle, computer monitor, bath tub, and toilet bowl.  Several exhibits specifically allow visitors to touch starfish and shellfish.

Facilities
The theme areas, in order of presentation, are:
1. Check-In
2. Rainbow Lounge
3. Story of Korean Fish
4. Garden of Korea
5. Fish in Wonderland
6. Amazonia World
7. Marine Touch Lab
8. Mangrove and Beach
9. Living Reef Gallery
10. Ocean Kingdom
11. Marine Mammal Village
12. Deep Blue Square
13. Deep Blue Sea Tunnel
14. Garden of Jelly Fish
15. Penguin's Playground
16. The Gift Shop

References

External links
 

Buildings and structures in Gangnam District
Aquaria in South Korea
Tourist attractions in Seoul
World Trade Center Seoul
2000 establishments in South Korea